15 Minutes is a 2001 American satirical buddy cop action thriller film directed and written by John Herzfeld and starring Robert De Niro and Edward Burns. Its story revolves around a homicide detective (De Niro) and a fire marshal (Burns) who join forces to apprehend a pair of Eastern European murderers (Karel Roden and Oleg Taktarov) videotaping their crimes in order to become rich and famous. The title is a reference to the Andy Warhol quotation, "In the future, everyone will be world-famous for 15 minutes."

Plot
Ex-convicts Emil Slovak and Oleg Razgul arrive in the United States to claim their part of a bank heist in eastern Europe. Oleg steals a video camera from an electronics store. At the rundown apartment of their old partner, they are denied their share of the spoils, so Emil fatally stabs the partner and his wife as Oleg tapes it with the camera. Czech immigrant Daphne Handlova witnesses the murders from the bathroom, then escapes before Emil and Oleg can kill her as well. To hide the crime, Emil burns down the apartment.

Jordy Warsaw is a New York City arson investigator assigned to the case. Also at the scene is Eddie Flemming, is a high-profile detective who is followed by his girlfriend Nicolette Karas, a reporter from the tabloid TV show Top Story. Flemming and Warsaw agree to work the case together. While checking out the crowd, Warsaw spots Daphne trying to get his attention, but she disappears. Meanwhile, Emil calls an escort service and asks for a "Czech girl." Oleg tapes Emil as he kills the escort and learns the address of the escort service. Oleg continually films everything, claiming he wants to be the next Frank Capra.

Flemming and Warsaw investigate this murder and visit the escort service. The madam, Rose Hearn, tells them that the girl Warsaw described doesn't work for her but rather a hairdresser. She mentions a couple of other guys having just asked her the same questions. Flemming and Warsaw arrive at the hair salon just after Emil and Oleg have warned Daphne to keep quiet. Flemming notices Oleg filming them from across the street. In the ensuing foot chase, Flemming's regular partner Leon Jackson is hit with a glass bottle and his wallet and gun are stolen. Emil finds a card with Flemming's name and address. He becomes jealous of Flemming's celebrity status and is convinced that anyone in America can get away with anything.

On the night Flemming plans to propose to Nicolette, Oleg and Emil sneak into his house and bind Flemming to a chair. While Oleg is recording, Emil explains that he plans to kill Flemming and sell the tape to Top Story. After getting himself committed to an insane asylum, Emil will declare that he is actually sane. Since he can't be tried again, he will get off, collecting royalties from books and movies based on his crimes. Flemming attacks them with his chair (while still taped to it), but Emil gets the upper-hand and stabs him in the chest, mortally wounding him. Emil then suffocates and kills Flemming with a pillow.

The entire city is in mourning. Emil sells the tape of Flemming's murder to Top Story anchor Robert Hawkins in exchange for $1 million, outraging Warsaw and the entire police force. Emil and Oleg watch the tape's broadcast on Top Story inside a Planet Hollywood; customers realize that Emil and Oleg are sitting with them and panic. Police arrive and arrest Emil, while Oleg escapes. Warsaw takes Emil to an abandoned warehouse to kill him, but other police arrive just in time and take Emil into custody. Everything goes as planned for Emil, now a celebrity who is pleading insanity. His lawyer agrees to work for 30% of the royalties Emil will receive for his story. Meanwhile, in hiding, Oleg becomes jealous of the notoriety that Emil is receiving.

While the lawyer is leading Emil away in court, Warsaw provokes an argument, with the Top Story crew recording the whole thing. Oleg quietly approaches Hawkins and hands him the tape of Emil explaining his plan to Flemming, proving he was sane the whole time. Hawkins shouts out to Emil about the evidence in his possession. Emil grabs a policeman's gun, shoots Oleg and grabs Nicolette, threatening to shoot her. Against orders, Warsaw shoots Emil a dozen times in the chest to avenge Flemming's murder. Hawkins rushes to Oleg's side as he dies. He attempts to get a comment from Warsaw, who punches him and walks away as the police all smile with approval.

Cast
 Robert De Niro as Detective Eddie Flemming
 Edward Burns as FDNY Fire Marshal Jordan Warsaw
 Kelsey Grammer as Robert Hawkins
 Avery Brooks as Detective Leon Jackson
 Melina Kanakaredes as Nicolette Karas
 Karel Roden as Emil Slovák
 Oleg Taktarov as Oleg Razgul
 Vera Farmiga as Daphne Handlova
 John DiResta as Bobby Korfin
 James Handy as Deputy Chief Declan Duffy
 Darius McCrary as Detective Tommy Cullen
 Bruce Cutler as himself
 Charlize Theron as Rose Hearn
 Kim Cattrall as Cassandra
 Paul Herman as Detective Paulie
 David Alan Grier as The Mugger
 Vladimir Mashkov as Milos Karlov
 Irina Gasanova as Tamina Karlova
 Noelle Evans as "Honey"
 Tygh Runyan as Stephen Geller
 Ritchie Coster as News Stand Vendor
 Gabriel Casseus as Unique
 Anton Yelchin as Boy In Burning Building

Production

The film was shot on location in New York City and Los Angeles from May to July 1999. It was originally slated to be released by New Line Cinema in the spring of 2000, with theatrical trailers appearing in late 1999. For reasons unknown, the film was pulled from the spring 2000 schedule and then delayed until the following year, on March 9, 2001.

Reception

Box office
The film grossed $24,403,552 domestically in the United States and Canada. It made a further $31,956,428 internationally, for a worldwide total of $56,359,980 against a production budget of $42 million.

Critical response
Review aggregator website Rotten Tomatoes gave the film an approval rating of 32% based on reviews from 125 critics, with an average rating of 4.42/10. The site's consensus reads, "As critical as it is about sensationalism in the media, 15 Minutes itself indulges in lurid violence, and its satire is too heavy-handed to be effective." It currently holds a 34 out of 100 rating on Metacritic, based on 32 critical reviews, indicating "generally unfavorable reviews".

Roger Ebert of Chicago Sun-Times gave it three out of four stars, calling it "a cynical, savage satire about violence, the media and depravity." Ebert felt "It doesn't have the polish of "Natural Born Killers" or the wit of "Wag the Dog," but it's a real movie, rough edges and all, and not another link from the sausage factory."

On the negative side, Stephen Hunter of The Washington Post wrote:

Owen Gleiberman of Entertainment Weekly stated: "At the movies, we’re now bamboozled into expecting not drama but sensation, and so it’s no surprise that the plot of a movie like 15 Minutes is less an end in itself than an excuse, a jumping-off point for showy, contrived, borderline-exploitation sequences that fail to tie together because they’re not really there to do anything but sell themselves as money-shot thrills. ... 15 Minutes is a glum and sadistic mess."

References

External links
 
 
 
 

2001 films
2001 crime thriller films
2000s serial killer films
American action thriller films
American satirical films
American crime thriller films
American buddy cop films
Camcorder films
Films about television
Films about firefighting
Films directed by John Herzfeld
Films shot in New York City
Films set in New York City
Films scored by Anthony Marinelli
Films scored by J. Peter Robinson
English-language German films
German action thriller films
German crime thriller films
German satirical films
German serial killer films
New Line Cinema films
American police detective films
American serial killer films
2000s buddy cop films
2000s police procedural films
New York City Fire Department
2000s English-language films
2000s American films
2000s German films